Roger Menama Lukaku (born 6 June 1967) is a Congolese former footballer who played as a forward. Throughout his career, he played for KV Oostende, KV Mechelen and Germinal Ekeren. He is the father of footballers Romelu Lukaku and Jordan Lukaku.

Early life
Roger Lukaku was born in Zaire in 1967. He started out playing football for Vita Sports, a local club, before moving to Africa Sports d'Abidjan.

Club career
In 1990, at the age of 23, Roger Lukaku began his career in Belgium. His first club was Belgian Second Division club FC Boom. With this club he achieved promotion to the Belgian First Division in 1992. The club was relegated in 1993 and Lukaku moved to RFC Seraing.

With RFC Seraing he finished 3rd in the Belgian First Division. He stayed with RFC Seraing for two seasons before moving to Germinal Ekeren. Again his club finished in 3rd place.

In 1996, he played for Turkish side Gençlerbirligi SK but he returned to Belgium after only one season to play for KV Mechelen. In 1998, he changed club and played for Belgian First Division side KV Oostende.

After the relegation of the club in 1999 the 32-year-old stopped playing professional football. He continued to play in lower divisions for Aat, KFC Wintam and in 2006 for KGR Katelijne where he finished his playing career.

International career
Lukaku played for the Zaire national football team in the 1994 FIFA World Cup qualifying rounds. He also participated at the 1994 and 1996 African Cup of Nations finals.

Personal life
After retiring, he and his wife Adolphine fell into poverty. He is the father of professional footballers Romelu Lukaku and Jordan Tafara Lukaku and uncle of Boli Bolingoli.

References

External links

1967 births
Living people
Footballers from Kinshasa
Democratic Republic of the Congo footballers
Association football forwards
AS Vita Club players
Africa Sports d'Abidjan players
K. Rupel Boom F.C. players
R.F.C. Seraing (1904) players
K.V. Mechelen players
K.V. Oostende players
Gençlerbirliği S.K. footballers
Linafoot players
Ligue 1 (Ivory Coast) players
Belgian Pro League players
Challenger Pro League players
Süper Lig players
Democratic Republic of the Congo international footballers
1994 African Cup of Nations players
1996 African Cup of Nations players
Democratic Republic of the Congo expatriate footballers
Democratic Republic of the Congo expatriate sportspeople in Belgium
Democratic Republic of the Congo expatriate sportspeople in Ivory Coast
Democratic Republic of the Congo expatriate sportspeople in Turkey
Expatriate footballers in Belgium
Expatriate footballers in Ivory Coast
Expatriate footballers in Turkey
Democratic Republic of the Congo emigrants to Belgium